The Gongchen Bridge is a historic stone arch bridge over the Grand Canal in Gongshu District of Hangzhou, Zhejiang, China.

History
Gongchen Bridge was originally built in 1631, during the ruling of Chongzhen Emperor of the Ming dynasty (1368–1644), and was rebuilt in 1885, during the reign of Guangxu Emperor of the Qing dynasty (1644–1911). On 6 May 2013, it was listed among the seventh batch of "Major National Historical and Cultural Sites in Zhejiang" by the State Council of China.

Gallery

Surrounding area
East Gongchen Bridge station

References

Bridges in Zhejiang
Arch bridges in China
Bridges completed in 1885
Qing dynasty architecture
Buildings and structures completed in 1885
1885 establishments in China
Major National Historical and Cultural Sites in Zhejiang